Peter Hardcastle was an English professional footballer who played as a full back. Active for three clubs between 1971 and 1978, Hardcastle made over 100 appearances in the Football League.

Career
Hardcastle began his career as an amateur with Skelmersdale United, and represented the England amateur team that attempted to qualify for the 1972 Summer Olympics in March 1971. Hardcastle turned professional that same summer with Blackpool, making 36 appearances in the Football League over the next three seasons. During the 1971–72 campaign, which was Bob Stokoe's first full season in charge of the Seasiders, Hardcastle made sixteen appearances. His debut came on 4 December, when Blackpool played host to Preston North End at Bloomfield Road in the West Lancashire derby. The following season, he made nineteen League appearances, as well as helping the club to the fifth round of the League Cup. He made one appearance in 1973–74. It was as a substitute in a 3–2 defeat at Leyton Orient on 15 September, which proved to be his final appearance for the Tangerines, who were by then under the guidance of Harry Potts.

Hardcastle then signed for Plymouth Argyle, making a further 14 League appearances over the next two-and-a-half seasons. Hardcastle's final club was Bradford City, where he spent two further seasons, and made a further 62 appearances in the League.

References

Year of birth missing (living people)
Living people
English footballers
Skelmersdale United F.C. players
Blackpool F.C. players
Plymouth Argyle F.C. players
Bradford City A.F.C. players
English Football League players
Association football defenders